Dingzigu Subdistrict is a subdistrict situated in the northern part of Hongqiao District, Tianjin, China. It borders Tianmu Town to its north, Xinkaihe Subdistrict to its east, Xigu and Xiyuzhuang Subdistricts to its south, and Xianyang North Road Subdistrict to its west. Its population was 98,652 as of 2010.

The subdistrict was formed in 1952. Its name Dingzigu comes from the fact that the section of the Grand Canal that passes through this region is shaped like a Chinese Character Ding (丁).

Geography 
Dingzigu subdistrict is situated on the south of Grand Canal.

Administrative divisions 
At the end of 2021, Dingzigu Subdistrict comprised 14 residential communities. They can be seen in the list below:

See also 

 List of township-level divisions of Tianjin

References 

Township-level divisions of Tianjin
Hongqiao District, Tianjin